Hingutargarh is a village in Chandauli district, Uttar Pradesh, India.

References

Villages in Chandauli district